The Salon du Chocolat (Literally, Salon of Chocolate in French, but more loosely translated Paris Chocolate Show) is a yearly trade fair for the international chocolate industry.

Begun in 1994, the event is supported by the French Ministry of Foreign Affairs.  It has previously been held in Paris, New York, Tokyo, and Moscow.  It was held in Beijing in 2009 and Shanghai in 2010, reflecting the industry's interest in promoting China as a new consumer of chocolate.

References

External link

Chocolate industry